This is a list of diseases starting with the letter "Z".

Z
 Zadik–Barak–Levin syndrome
 ZAP70 deficiency
 Zamzam–Sheriff–Phillips syndrome
 Zechi-Ceide syndrome
 Zellweger syndrome
 Zenker's diverticulum
 Zieve's syndrome
Zika Virus
 Zimmerman–Laband syndrome
 Zinc deficiency
 Zinc toxicity
 Zlotogora syndrome
 Zollinger–Ellison syndrome
 Zonular cataract and nystagmus
 Zori–Stalker–Williams syndrome
 Zunich–Kaye syndrome
 Zuska's disease
 Zygomycosis

Z